Ad-din Women's Medical College (AWMC) is a private medical college in Bangladesh, exclusively for female students, established in 2008. It is located in Maghbazar, Dhaka. It is affiliated with Dhaka University as a constituent college.

It offers a five-year course of study leading to a Bachelor of Medicine, Bachelor of Surgery (MBBS) degree. A one-year internship after graduation is compulsory for all graduates. The degree is recognized by the Bangladesh Medical and Dental Council (BMDC)

History
Ad-din Foundation, a non-governmental organization dedicated to serving the disadvantaged, established Ad-din Women's Medical College in 2008. It is the first of four medical colleges the organization operates in Bangladesh.

Campus
The college is located in Maghbazar, Dhaka, within the premises of 500-bed Ad-din Medical College Hospital. The hospital treats men and women, but over 90% of its patients are women or children.

Organization and administration
The college is affiliated with Dhaka University as a constituent college. The chairman is Rafique-ul Huq. The principal is Prof. Dr. Afiquor Rahman.

Academics
The college offers a five-year course of study, approved by the Bangladesh Medical and Dental Council (BMDC), leading to a Bachelor of Medicine, Bachelor of Surgery (MBBS) degree from Dhaka University. After passing the final professional examination, there is a compulsory one-year internship. The internship is a prerequisite for obtaining registration from the BMDC to practice medicine. In October 2014, the Ministry of Health and Family Welfare capped admission and tuition fees at private medical colleges at 1,990,000 Bangladeshi taka (US$25,750 as of 2014) total for their five-year courses.

The college admits only female students. Admission for Bangladeshis to the MBBS programmes at all medical colleges in Bangladesh (government and private) is conducted centrally by the Directorate General of Health Services (DGHS). It administers a written multiple choice question exam simultaneously throughout the country. Candidates are admitted based primarily on their score on this test, although grades at Secondary School Certificate (SSC) and Higher Secondary School Certificate (HSC) level also play a part. Seats are reserved for daughters of Freedom Fighters, and 5% of seats are reserved for students from underprivileged backgrounds. As of July 2014, the college is allowed to admit 75 students annually.

References

External links
 

Medical colleges in Bangladesh
Universities and colleges in Dhaka
Hospitals in Bangladesh
Educational institutions established in 2008
2008 establishments in Bangladesh
Women's universities and colleges in Bangladesh